Siegfried Rothemund (born 14 March 1944) is a German film director. He directed more than ninety films since 1964. He is the father of Marc Rothemund who is also a film director. He was married to the actress Margit Geissler.

Selected filmography
Films and Miniseries

Television Series (as Sigi Rothemund)

References

External links 

1944 births
Living people
German mass media people